Iraq first competed at the Asian Games in 1974.

Medal tables

Medals by Asian Games

References